The Brazilian imperial family (Brazilian Portuguese: Família Imperial Brasileira) is a Brazilian dynasty of Portuguese origin that ruled the Empire of Brazil from 1822 to 1889, after the proclamation of independence by Prince Pedro of Braganza who was later acclaimed as Pedro I, Constitutional Emperor and Perpetual Defender of Brazil. The members of the family are dynastic descendants of Emperor Pedro I. Claimants to headship of the post-monarchic Brazilian Imperial legacy descend from Emperor Pedro II, including the senior agnates of two branches of the House of Orléans-Braganza; the so-called Petrópolis and Vassouras lines. Prince Pedro Carlos of Orléans-Braganza (born 1945) heads the Petrópolis line, while the Vassouras branch is led by his second cousin, Bertrand of Orléans-Braganza.

Rivalry within the family erupted in 1946 when Dom Pedro Gastão (1913–2007) repudiated the renunciation to the throne of his late father, Pedro de Alcântara, Prince of Grão-Pará (1875–1940), for himself and his future descendants, when he made a non-dynastic marriage in 1908. Pedro de Alcântara was the eldest son of the Princess Imperial Isabel (1846–1921) who, as Pedro II's elder daughter and heir presumptive when he was dethroned, became the last undisputed head of the family after her father's death in exile in 1891. Pedro Carlos is Dom Pedro Gastão's eldest son. Dom Bertrand descends from Isabel's younger son, Prince Luís (1878–1920) who, by a Bourbon princess, fathered Prince Pedro Henrique (1909–1981). Dom Bertrand is Pedro Henrique's son by a Bavarian princess and upholds his dynastic claim to the same legacy.

Following the tradition of the Portuguese monarchy, the closest relatives of the Brazilian emperor are considered members of the Brazilian imperial family.

History

Founded by Pedro of Braganza, until then Prince Royal of the United Kingdom of Portugal, Brazil and the Algarves, member of the House of Braganza, heir apparent to the Portuguese throne and the King's representative in the Kingdom of Brazil as Prince Regent, the Imperial House of Brazil was sovereign from 7 September 1822, when Prince Pedro proclaimed the independence of the Kingdom of Brazil from the United Kingdom of Portugal, Brazil and the Algarves and was subsequently acclaimed as Emperor of Brazil on 12 October that same year until 15 November 1889, when a military coup d'état took place and the proclamation of the Brazilian republic overthrew the monarchy.

Prince Pedro, then, was acclaimed as Emperor of Brazil throughout the land. The constitution of the Brazilian Empire of 1824 – the first Brazilian constitutional charter – was organized two years after independence, with the emperor being the head of state and head of government of the Empire of Brazil, as well as head of the moderator power and the executive power. He reigned until 7 April 1831 when he abdicated due to a long ideological conflict between with a sizable parliamentary faction over the role of the monarch in the government and other obstacles. Pedro I's successor in Brazil was his five-year-old son, Pedro II. As the latter was still a minor, a weak regency was created. The power vacuum resulting from the absence of a ruling monarch as the ultimate arbiter in political disputes led to regional civil wars between local factions. Having inherited an empire on the verge of disintegration, Pedro II, once he was declared of age, managed to bring peace and stability to the country, which eventually became an emerging international power. Even though the last four decades of Pedro II's reign were marked by continuous internal peace and economic prosperity, he had no expectation to see the monarchy survive beyond his lifetime and made no effort to maintain support for the institution. The next in line to the throne was his daughter Isabel, but neither Pedro II nor the ruling classes considered a female monarch acceptable. Lacking any viable heir, the Empire's political leaders saw no reason to defend the monarchy. After a 58-year reign, on 15 November 1889 the Emperor was overthrown in a sudden coup d'état led by a clique of military leaders whose goal was the formation of a republic headed by a dictator, forming the First Brazilian Republic.

Post monarchy
 
With the proclamation of the Brazilian republic on 15 November 1889, the imperial family went into exile in Portugal, Spain, France and Austria-Hungary. In the party that accompanied the imperial family were included many loyal subjects and nobles, as politicians such the Viscount of Ouro Preto, the deposed last Prime Minister of the Empire, as well the Emperor's particular doctor. Prince August Leopold of Saxe-Coburg and Gotha, grandson of Emperor Pedro II was the only member of the imperial family not boarded to exile because he was on board the cruiser Almirante Barroso, on a circumnavigation trip. Subsequently, upon receiving the news of the deposition of the monarchy, he was sent into exile. In addition to the ban, the Republican government confiscated and auctioned many of the assets of the imperial family. In 1890, thirteen auctions of Imperial House goods were made. Empress Teresa Cristina died in the first months of exile. Later Emperor Pedro II died in France, where he received a head of state's funeral by the French government. The imperial family settled in the Château d'Eu, former residence of King Louis Philippe of France and property of Gaston of Orléans, Count d'Eu, husband of Isabel, Princess Imperial of Brazil, heiress of Pedro II and de jure Empress-in-Exile of Brazil.

Despite the prohibition then in force, Prince Luiz of Orléans-Braganza tried to disembark in Rio de Janeiro in 1906, but was prevented by local authorities. Finally, President Epitácio Pessoa, by presidential decree of 3 September 1920, revoked the Banishment Law. The Imperial Family was then able to return to Brazilian soil. The occasion was used to repatriate the remains of the last emperor and his consort, who would be transferred from Portugal a year later. Of the nine members of the imperial family originally exiled, only two returned to Brazil alive: Pedro de Alcântara, Prince of Grão-Pará and his father, Prince Gaston, Count of Eu, who died the following year aboard the ship Massilia, on their way to Brazil to celebrate the centenary of independence. Prince Pedro de Alcântara acquired one of its former palaces, the Palácio do Grão-Pará in Petropolis, where it resided until his death and where his descendants still live. On the other hand, not all the family returned immediately to Brazil, and the Vassouras branch, present clamoring to the Brazilian throne, could only return after the end of World War II.

Repatriation

Currently, the remains of five members of the imperial family are buried in the Imperial Mausoleum in Petrópolis: Emperor Pedro II and Empress Teresa Cristina, whose mortal remains were transferred from the Royal Pantheon of the House of Braganza in Lisbon, in 1921, on the occasion of the centenary of the Independence of Brazil, Princess Isabel, removed from the cemetery of Eu in 1953 with her husband, Prince Gaston, and the Prince of Grão-Pará, transferred from the cemetery of Petrópolis in 1990, together with his wife. Prince Luiz and Prince Antônio are buried in the Royal Chapel of Dreux, France, where the wife of the first, Princess Maria Pia, was buried in 1973. Princes Pedro Augusto, August Leopold, Joseph Ferdinand and Ludwig Gaston are buried in the crypt of the Church of St. Augustine in Coburg, Germany, where their mother, Princess Leopoldina, had been buried in 1871.

In 1954, the remains of the first Empress, Maria Leopoldina, were transferred to the Imperial Crypt and Chapel in São Paulo, which were in the Santo Antônio Convent, Rio de Janeiro. Some of the children of both emperors are buried in the Santo Antônio Convent: Prince Miguel, Prince João Carlos, Princess Paula Mariana, Prince Afonso Pedro and Prince Pedro Afonso, as well as Princess Luísa Vitória. In 1972, on the occasion of the sesquicentenary of Independence, the remains of Emperor Pedro I were transferred from the Royal Pantheon of the House of Braganza to the Imperial Chapel. The body of his second wife, Empress Amélie, was transferred from the Braganza Pantheon to the Imperial Chapel in 1982. In that same year the body of her daughter, Princess Maria Amélia, was transferred from the Braganza Pantheon to the Convent of Santo Antônio.

Dynastic question

The so-called Brazilian dynastic question concerns inheritance rights to the titles of Head of the Brazilian Imperial House, Prince Imperial of Brazil, Prince of Grão-Pará and Prince of Brazil, who consequently would indicate the preferred heirs of to the Brazilian imperial throne. The primacy in the line of succession is disputed by some members and partisans of the dynastic branches of Petrópolis and Vassouras.

In 1908, Dom Pedro de Alcântara, then Prince Imperial of Brazil in exile, wanted to marry Countess Elisabeth Dobržensky de Dobrženicz (1875–1951), whose family had belonged to the nobility of the kingdom of Bohemia since 1339, and whose legitimate members, male and female, bore the title of baron since 1744 and of count or countess since issuance of Austrian letters patent on 21 February 1906. The countess did not, however, belong to a  reigning or formerly reigning dynasty, as both Orléans and Braganza traditions expected of brides. Although the constitution of the Brazilian Empire did not require dynasts to marry equally, it made the marriage of the heir to the throne dependent upon the sovereign's consent. As Prince Dom Pedro wanted to marry with his mother's blessing, he renounced his rights to the throne of Brazil at Cannes on 30 October 1908. The resignation document, signed in three copies, was sent to the Brazilian Monarchical Directory, an official body created to manage monarchical interests in the country. To solemnize this, Dom Pedro, aged thirty-three, signed the document translated here:

This renunciation was followed by a letter from Isabel to royalists in Brazil:

If the 1908 renunciation of Pedro de Alcântara was valid, his brother Luiz (and eventually, Pedro Henrique) became next in the line of succession after their mother. Isabel's headship of the Brazilian Imperial House lasted until her death in 1921, when she is widely considered to have been succeeded by her grandson, Prince Pedro Henrique of Orléans-Braganza. Pedro Henrique was the elder son of Prince Luiz, second child of Isabel and a veteran of World War I who had died in 1920 from an illness he contracted in the trenches.

Prince Pedro de Alcântara did not dispute the validity of the renunciation. Though he did not claim the headship of the Imperial House himself, in 1937 he did say in an interview that his renunciation "did not meet the requirements of Brazilian Law, there was no prior consultation with the nation, there was none of the necessary protocol that is required for acts of this nature and, furthermore, it was not a hereditary renunciation."

The dynastic dispute over the Brazilian crown began after 1940 when Prince Pedro Gastão of Orléans-Braganza, eldest son of Pedro de Alcântara repudiated his father's renunciation and claimed the headship of the Brazilian Imperial House.

Pedro Gastão actively campaigned in support of Brazil's 1993 referendum on restoration of the Brazilian monarchy, which would have postponed for subsequent decision by Parliament of which descendant of the former imperial family should occupy the throne if monarchy had been re-instated, but the option of restoration was defeated despite garnering approximately 17 million votes. After the death of Pedro Gastão in 2007, his eldest son Prince Pedro Carlos and younger children declared themselves republicans. Several of Pedro Gastão's grandchildren also have dual citizenship.

Branches

House of Orléans-Braganza

With the marriage of Isabel of Braganza, Princess Imperial of Brazil, with Prince Gaston of Orléans, Count d'Eu in 1864, the Imperial House associated itself with the House of Orléans, that composes the French royal family. Thus began a new dynastic branch of Brazil: Orléans-Braganza, which never had the opportunity to reign in Brazil.

Of the four children of the couple, two have generated offspring and this branch of the family has more than thirty members. Many are those who renounced for themselves and their descendants any rights in succession to the imperial throne, losing titles and precedence in the imperial family.

In 1909, Prince Gaston engaged in negotiations with Philippe, Duke of Orléans, resulting in a document signed by nearly all the male-line princes descended from France's citizen-king, Louis Philippe, called the Pacte de Famille (or "Declaration of Brussels"): the title of Prince of Orléans-Braganza was created, and the style of Royal Highness recognized, exclusive to male-line descendants of that branch of the family.

House of Saxe-Coburg-Braganza

The Saxe-Coburg-Braganza branch is descended from Princess Leopoldina of Brazil, second daughter of Dom Pedro II, and her husband, Prince Ludwig August of the House of Saxe-Coburg and Gotha-Koháry. Due to several years of difficulties that the Princess Imperial Isabel experienced in producing an heir to the throne, clauses were included in the marriage contract between Leopoldina and her husband to ensure that the couple should, among other things, reside part of the year in Brazil and have their children on Brazilian territory, as heirs presumptive of Isabel: Pedro Augusto, Augusto Leopoldo, and José Fernando. With the birth of Dom Pedro de Alcântara, Prince of Grão-Pará and eldest son of Princess Isabel, the Saxe-Coburg-Braganza branch yielded first place in the line of succession to the Orleans-Braganza branch.
 
The only members of the Saxe-Coburg-Braganza branch who still retain Brazilian nationality, which was a constitutional requirement to succeed to the now defunct Brazilian throne, are the descendants of Princess Teresa Cristina of Saxe-Coburg and Gotha, daughter of Augusto Leopoldo. Her Brazilian nationality was recognized by the government of Brazil only in 1922; her four children were registered in the consulate of Brazil in Vienna as Brazilian citizens. Carlos Tasso de Saxe-Coburgo e Bragança, Baron Taxis-Bordogna-Valnigra and son of Princess Teresa Cristina, is the current head of this branch.

Emperors of Brazil

The Empire of Brazil remained a constitutional monarchy until 1889 – when the republic was proclaimed after a military coup d'état, and had two reigning emperors, both from the House of Braganza:

Dom Pedro I of Brazil (1822–1831): Born in 1798, deceased in 1834. Was also King of Portugal in 1826, as Pedro IV.
Dom Pedro II of Brazil (Regency 1831–1840; Reigned personally 1840–1889): Born in 1825 and deceased in 1891.

Their full style and title were: "His Imperial Majesty, Constitutional Emperor and Perpetual Defender of Brazil".

Pretenders to the Brazilian throne since 1889

Pedro II of Brazil (1889–1891)
Isabel of Brazil (1891–1921): Born in 1846, died in 1921. Princess Imperial and former regent of Brazil, she was the elder daughter of Pedro II and after his death considered de jure Empress of Brazil

The Vassouras line

Pedro Henrique of Orléans-Braganza (1921–1981): Born in 1909, died in 1981. Grandson of Princess Isabel, son and heir of her second son, Prince Luís of Orléans-Braganza (1878–1920).
Luiz of Orléans-Braganza (1981–2022): Born in 1938, died in 2022, the eldest son of Prince Pedro Henrique
 Bertrand of Orléans-Braganza (2022–present): born in 1941, third son of Prince Pedro Henrique 
 Heir : Antônio of Orléans-Braganza (born in 1950)

The Petrópolis line

Pedro Gastão of Orléans-Braganza (1940–2007): Born in 1913, son of Isabel's eldest son, who had renounced all rights to the Brazilian throne for himself and his descendants. The validity of the renunciation was disputed by Pedro Gastão.
 Pedro Carlos of Orléans-Braganza (2007–present): eldest son of Pedro Gastão. He doesn't put in question the validity of the renunciation. Contrariwise, he declared himself a republican. 
 Heir : Pedro Thiago of Orléans-Braganza (born in 1979)

Past members and some descendants of the imperial family

Dom Pedro I of Brazil (1798–1834)

Dona Maria II of Portugal (1819–1853)
Miguel, Prince of Beira (1820)
Dom João Carlos, Prince of Beira (1821–1822)
Dona Januária Maria, Princess Imperial of Brazil (1822–1901)
Princess Dona Paula Mariana of Brazil (1823–1833)
Princess Dona Francisca Carolina of Brazil (1824–1898)
Dom Pedro II of Brazil (1825–1891)
Dom Afonso Pedro de Alcântara, Prince Imperial of Brazil (1845–1847)
Dona Isabel Cristina, Princess Imperial of Brazil (1846–1921)
Dom Pedro de Alcântara, Prince of Grão Para (1875–1940)
Isabelle of Orléans-Braganza (1911–2003)
Pedro Gastão of Orléans-Braganza (1913–2007)
Pedro Carlos of Orléans-Braganza (born 1945)
Pedro Thiago of Orléans-Braganza (born 1979)
Filipe Rodrigo of Orléans-Braganza (born 1982)
Maria da Glória of Orléans-Braganza (born 1946)
Maria Francisca of Orléans-Braganza (1914–1968)
João Maria of Orléans-Braganza (1916–2005)
Prince Dom Luiz Maria of Orléans-Braganza (1878–1920)
Pedro Henrique of Orléans-Braganza (1909–1981)
Luiz of Orleans-Braganza (1938-2022)
Eudes Maria of Orléans-Braganza (1939–2020)
Luiz Philippe of Orléans-Braganza (born 1969)
Bertrand of Orléans-Braganza (born 1941)
Antônio João of Orléans-Braganza (born 1950)
Pedro Luiz of Orléans-Braganza (1983–2009)
Rafael Antônio of Orléans-Braganza (born 1986)
Eleonora Maria of Orléans-Braganza (born 1953)
Henrique Antônio de Ligne (born 1989)
Luís Gastão of Orléans-Braganza (1911–1931)
Pia Maria of Orléans-Braganza (1913–2000)
Prince Dom Antônio Gastão of Orléans-Braganza (1881–1918)
Princess Dona Leopoldina of Brazil (1847–1871)
 Prince Pedro Augusto of Saxe-Coburg and Gotha (1866–1934)
 Prince Augusto Leopoldo of Saxe-Coburg and Gotha (1867–1922)
 Princess Teresa Cristina of Saxe-Coburg and Gotha (1902–1990)
 Carlos Tasso of Saxe-Coburg and Braganza (born 1931)
 Prince José Fernando of Saxe-Coburg and Gotha (1869–1888)
Dom Pedro Afonso, Prince Imperial of Brazil (1848–1850)
Princess Dona Maria Amélia of Brazil (1831–1853)

Genealogy
Genealogical tree of the Brazilian branch House of Braganza and the subsequent House of Orléans-Braganza, cadet branch and current Imperial Family.

Armorial

Estates and properties

See also
History of Brazil
House of Orléans-Braganza
Emperor of Brazil
Prince Imperial of Brazil
Prince of Grão-Pará

References

External links
Imperial House of Brazil Official Website of the Vassouras Line
Imperial Brazil Institute

Royal families of the Americas
Brazilian royalty
Imperial family
Brazilian monarchy
1822 establishments in Brazil